Ballari Sriramulu (born 8 August 1971) is an Indian politician who is currently serving as Minister of Transport Department and Tribal Welfare of Karnataka from 4 August 2021. He was the Minister of Social Welfare Department of Karnataka from 12 October 2020 to 26 July 2021. He was member of Karnataka Legislative Assembly from Bellary. He is a member of the legislative assembly representing Molakalmuru Constituency in Chitradurga district. He is the Social Welfare minister in the Government of Karnataka. He served as a Health and Family welfare minister previously from (2008-2011 and August 2019 to October 2020) also as a Minister of Backward class welfare from September 2019 to October 2020. He serves in the Bharatiya Janata Party government led by B. S. Yediyurappa. He served as a member of Lok Sabha from 2014-2018 from Bellary.

Early life 

B. Sriramulu was born in Bellary, Karnataka on 8 August 1971 to B. Thimmappa, a railway employee and B. Honnuramma, a housewife. He is the seventh child among four brothers and four sisters.

Career 

In the 1999 Lok Sabha elections Sriramulu worked as a local aide for Sushma Swaraj, who contested from Bellary Lok Sabha constituency, when she contested against the Congress giant Sonia Gandhi, to give a fierce fight and lose at a close margin. With the support of Sriramulu and Janardhan Reddy, she later won the election from the same constituency in the next general elections.

In the 2008 Karnataka Legislative Assembly election he was elected from the Bellary constituency, where BJP had their first chance to form the government independently under the leadership of B. S. Yediyurappa. He later served as the Minister for health and family welfare for around 3 years in the Karnataka government.
In September 2011, he resigned his post as the cabinet minister and also from the post of the MLA and he later quit the BJP, accusing and owing to alleged humiliation shouted out at his friend and  mentor and jailed the former tourism minister Gali Janardhan Reddy for acquiring illegal wealth from various sources without documentation.

Subsequently, with much competition and considering it to be a prestige, he contested as an Independent candidate again from the Bellary Rural constituency and also won. He then floated a regional party, Badavara Shramikara Raithara Congress or BSR Congress. He also announced that his party is going to contest from all the constituencies in the 2013 Karnataka Legislative Assembly election. Though his party did not manage to win many of the seats, it gave a major setback to BJP, by dividing the vote share mainly in the Hyderabad-Karnataka region, and shut the seat share to only 40 seats for the BJP.

After his party faced the election defeat in 2013, he decided to merge his party with the BJP, saying that he and his party are keen to work, to bring Narendra Modi to power in the 2014 Indian general elections.
In March 2014 he again joined BJP and contested Lok Sabha election from Bellary where he slidingly won the seat.

He is BJP Karnataka, state vice-president. B. Sriramulu was health, tourism Bellary district minister in the Yeddyurappa government.

In 2018, Karnataka assembly elections, Sriramulu contested from Molkalmuru and Badami. He won Molkalmuru, by a margin of 40,000 odd votes, but lost the Badami seat by 1500 votes to the former chief minister Siddaramaiah.

On 27 July 2018, Sriramulu called for a separate state for North Karnataka due to alleged "injustice" in that part of the state. After the coalition government led by H. D. Kumaraswamy lost its majority, paving the way to BJP to form the government he was inducted as a minister into the cabinet. He serves as Minister of Health and Family Welfare in the government.

References

External links 
B. Sriramulu - Health and Family Welfare Department excluding Medical Education  at the Karnataka Legislative Assembly

1971 births
Living people
Kannada people
People from Bellary
State cabinet ministers of Karnataka
India MPs 2014–2019
Lok Sabha members from Karnataka
Bharatiya Janata Party politicians from Karnataka
BSR Congress politicians
Karnataka MLAs 2008–2013
Karnataka MLAs 2004–2007
Karnataka MLAs 2018–2023
Deputy Chief Ministers of Karnataka